David Berger (born 8 March 1968 in Würzburg) is a German theologian, author and gay activist.

Biography 

From 1991 to 1998, Berger studied philosophy, Catholic theology and German language and literature in Würzburg, Cologne and Dortmund. Berger is a German neo-Thomist and took a critical stance to the work of Karl Rahner. Berger was a professor of the Pontifical Academy of St. Thomas Aquinas in Rome and also worked as a religious education teacher at a high school in Erftstadt, Germany. The Catholic Church has since revoked his licence to teach.

In 2010, Berger's homosexuality was publicized. He then published his book Der heilige Schein: Als schwuler Theologe in der katholischen Kirche ("The holy appearance: Being a gay theologian in the Catholic church"), in which he claimed that 20 to 40 percent of the Catholic clergy were homosexual.

He subsequently was the editor-in-chief of the gay periodical Männer (Berlin). He increasingly took a critical stance towards Islam and immigration, which in February 2015 led to him being dismissed from that position and to Berger distancing himself from the German LGBT movement. Berger continues as an independent blogger and supports, among other things, the German anti-migration party AfD.

Works by Berger

 Natur und Gnade in systematischer Theologie und Religionspädagogik von der Mitte des 19. Jahrhunderts bis zur Gegenwart. S. Roderer. Regensburg 1998. .
 Thomas von Aquin und die Liturgie. Ed. Thomisticae. Cologne 2000.  (translation in English and French).
 Thomismus. Große Leitmotive der thomistischen Synthese und ihre Aktualität für die Gegenwart. Ed. Thomisticae. Cologne 2001. .
 Thomas von Aquins "Summa theologiae". Wissenschaftliche Buchgesellschaft. Darmstadt 2004. .
 Was ist ein Sakrament? Der hl. Thomas von Aquin und die Sakramente im allgemeinen. Franz Schmitt. Siegburg 2004. .
 Thomas von Aquin begegnen. Sankt-Ulrich. Augsburg 2002.  (translation in Hungarian: Budapest 2008).
 In der Schule des hl. Thomas von Aquin. Studien zur Geschichte des Thomismus. nova et vetera. Bonn 2005. .
 Der heilige Schein: Als schwuler Theologe in der katholischen Kirche. 2010. .
 Editor:
 Karl Rahner – Kritische Annäherungen. Franz Schmitt. Siegburg 2004. .
 together with Jörgen Vijgen: Thomistenlexikon. nova et vetera. Bonn 2006. .

References

External links 
 Philosophia Perennis – David Berger's blog
 Personal homepage of Berger (engl/German)
About David Berger. Where two worlds coincide (engl.)
 Frankfurter Rundschau: Ich darf nicht länger schweigen (German)
 Frankfurter Rundschau: Kirche feuert schwulen Theologen (German)
 kath.net: Ansonsten muss ich dies als Verleumdung betrachten (German)
 Spiegel:Theologe David Berger: Großteil katholischer Kleriker homosexuell
 Der Spiegel: Gay Comments – Pope Francis Not as Liberal as He Seems
 Die Welt: "Der heilige Schein"
 Pinknews: Over half of catholic priests are gay says vatican insider

1968 births
Living people
20th-century German Catholic theologians
21st-century German Catholic theologians
Dissident Roman Catholic theologians
Catholic philosophers
LGBT Roman Catholics
German gay writers
German male non-fiction writers
German critics of Islam
21st-century German LGBT people